Birat al-Jurd (also spelled Biret al-Jard) is a village in northwestern Syria, administratively part of the Hama Governorate, located west of Hama. Nearby localities include Wadi al-Uyun to the northwest, al-Rusafa to the north, Baarin to the east, Ayn Halaqim to the southeast and Ayn al-Shams to the south, According to the Syria Central Bureau of Statistics, Birat al-Jurd had a population of 1,670 in the 2004 census.

References

Populated places in Masyaf District